Nicolaas Jacobus de Wet, PC, QC (11 September 1873 – 16 March 1960) was a South African politician, lawyer, and judge who was Chief Justice of South Africa and acting Governor-General from 1943 to 1945.

Early life

De Wet was born and went to school in Aliwal North, and attended Victoria College in Stellenbosch. He then went to Downing College at the University of Cambridge, from which he earned his LLB (First Class, with the Chancellor's Medal) in 1895. He was admitted as an advocate (the South African equivalent of a barrister) in 1896. During the Anglo-Boer War he was military secretary to General Louis Botha, commandant-general of the Transvaal forces, and acted as an interpreter at the peace conference that ended the war in 1902.

Political career 

After the war, de Wet joined Botha in politics, and was a member of the Transvaal legislative assembly from 1907 to 1910. He was a legal adviser to the Transvaal delegation to the 1908-1909 National Convention that drew up the Constitution for the Union of South Africa. In 1913, he was appointed a King's Counsel. He was also a founder member of the Suid-Afrikaanse Akademie vir Wetenskap en Kuns ("South African Academy for Science and Art") in 1909.

De Wet was a member of the Union Parliament between 1913 and 1929, serving as a member of the House of Assembly from 1913 to 1920 and a Senator from 1920 to 1929.  He served in the South African Party government as Minister of Justice from 1913 to 1924.  As such, he had to deal with the legal aspects of an armed Afrikaner uprising against the government in 1914, and the 1922 Rand Revolt.

Judicial career 

De Wet was appointed a judge of the Supreme Court in 1932, a judge of the Appeal Court in 1937, and Chief Justice in 1939.  As Chief Justice, he was required ex officio to act as Officer Administering the Government under a dormant commission, in the absence of the Governor-General, which he did for two and a half years, from the death of Sir Patrick Duncan in 1943 and the appointment of Gideon Brand van Zyl in 1945.

He was appointed a member of the Privy Council of the United Kingdom in 1939.

Family life 

De Wet was married twice.  His first wife was Ella Scheepers, who is reputed to have composed the popular Afrikaans song Sarie Marais during the Anglo-Boer War.  His second wife was Jakomina du Toit.  He died in 1960.  His son by his first marriage, Dr. Quartus de Wet, was also a judge, and presided over the 1963 Rivonia Treason Trial of Nelson Mandela and other anti-apartheid activists.

References

Dictionary of South African Biography Volume IV

|-

1873 births
1960 deaths
People from Walter Sisulu Local Municipality
Cape Colony people
Afrikaner people
South African people of Dutch descent
South African Party (Union of South Africa) politicians
Governors-General of South Africa
Justice ministers of South Africa
Members of the House of Assembly (South Africa)
Members of the Senate of South Africa
Chief justices of South Africa
South African members of the Privy Council of the United Kingdom
South African Queen's Counsel
Alumni of Downing College, Cambridge